Coimbatore Broad Gauge Metro Railway  Cum Coimbatore Suburban Railway or Kovai Metro Cum Suburban Railway is a Broad Gauge Metro Cum Suburban railway planned for Coimbatore city. The circular railway line will help run through Coimbatore Junction, Podanur, Vellalore, Irugur, Singanallur, Pilamedu and Coimbatore North. This will certainly help decongest the city roads since this circular line passes through the main parts of Coimbatore city and ends within the coimbatore city limits, so this circular line is an urban line. Restoration of old Main Line (Which was Broad Gauge Vellore Station) Nanjundapuram Railway link line lengths 1 km will help plan circular urban electric train track. A senior official  with the Salem division says,  "if the revival of an old line can bring about so many benefits, it can be considered". However, Implementation of this project gets delayed due to the Proposed Coimbatore Metro.

Routes
These are the 5 routes.
Coimbatore Jn – Mettupalayam
 Coimbatore Jn. – Pollachi Jn.
 Coimbatore Jn – Tiruppur
 Coimbatore Jn – Palakkad Jn
 Coimbatore Jn – Irugur Jn – Podanur In – Coimbatore Jn (Proposed for Both Metro and Mainline Routes)(circular line as well as urban line).
Local passenger trains from Coimbatore Junction is operating on all the above mentioned sub urban routes except the Coimbatore Jn – Irugur Jn – Coimbatore Jn (circular line as well as urban line).

Suburban stations
Other stations like Chettipalayam, Urumandampalayam, Veerapandi and Pudupalayam are defunct. The people have asked to reopen the stations., The 1 km long Nanjundapuram Railway link line became completely defunct and was dismantled soon after the Coimbatore North – Irugur line was put to use.

Restoration of this Nanjundapuram Railway link line will help plan circular suburban electric train track connecting major train stations in the outskirts of Coimbatore like Mettupalayam, Irugur, Podanur, Pollachi etc to ease growing peripheral traffic.
Reopening this defunct Nanjundapuram Railway line & Station can benefit residents from Nanjundapuram, Ramanathapuram, Redfields, Puliakulam, Sowripalayam, Udayampalayam, Singanallur, Varadarajapuram, Uppilipalayam and Ondipudur areas of Coimbatore for train connections to onward destinations. Irugur via Nanjundapuram: This bye-pass connection from Irugur – Podanur line to Coimbatore bypassing Podanur had been laid long back at a time when Coimbatore was connected only from Podanur as a branch from Irugur–Podanur–Shoranur line. It was done to facilitate trains from Erode side to directly go to Coimbatore. However, this connection became superfluous when Coimbatore was directly connected from Irugur side via Pilamedu and Coimbatore North in 1953, and accordingly, this link line was removed at that time. Since the doubling work between Irugur–Coimbatore section is in progress, these double lines will be utilised for suburban traffic if required
This is the poignant backdrop of Nanjundapuram Railway Station now defunct.

List of railway stations

Coimbatore Broad Gauge Metro (Circular Suburban) Railway

List of closed railway stations

References

Transport in Coimbatore
5 ft 6 in gauge railways in India
Proposed railway lines in India
Proposed infrastructure in Tamil Nadu